Miguel Martínez de Corta (born 25 November 1981), known simply as Miguel, is a Spanish footballer who plays as a goalkeeper for CD Calahorra.

Club career
Miguel was born in Logroño, La Rioja. An unsuccessful youth graduate at FC Barcelona, he moved to Real Zaragoza in 2001 but did not make an impact with the first team, only playing four games – all during 2002–03's Segunda División – and conceding five goals as they returned to La Liga after a one-year absence.

After loan spells with Zamora CF and UE Lleida, Miguel was released by Zaragoza and joined SD Huesca, newly promoted to the second division. At the Aragonese neighbours, he also struggled to start.

In mid-July 2010, Miguel signed with division two club Albacete Balompié, as another player in the position, Jesús Cabrero, moved in the opposite direction. In his first season, he was back-up to Keylor Navas as the Manchegans were relegated.

In June 2012, after Albacete failed to gain promotion via the play-offs, Miguel signed for fellow Segunda División B side Deportivo Alavés who were eventually crowned champions, though he missed much of the season with a knee injury. He chose to remain in that tier with his hometown club UD Logroñés.

On 14 July 2021, he joined Primera División RFEF club Calahorra.

References

External links

1981 births
Living people
Sportspeople from Logroño
Spanish footballers
Footballers from La Rioja (Spain)
Association football goalkeepers
Segunda División players
Segunda División B players
Tercera División players
FC Barcelona C players
CD Calahorra players
Real Zaragoza B players
Real Zaragoza players
Zamora CF footballers
UE Lleida players
SD Huesca footballers
Albacete Balompié players
Deportivo Alavés players
UD Logroñés players
SD Ejea players
FC Barcelona players
Primera Federación players